IIMS may refer to:
 Indian Institute of Management Shillong
 Indonesia International Motor Show